Judith Margaret Brett  (born 1949, Melbourne) is an Emeritus Professor of politics at La Trobe University, Melbourne, Australia. She retired from La Trobe in 2012, after a restructuring of the Faculty of Humanities and Social Sciences in which the School of which she was head was dismantled
.

Her PhD from Melbourne University’s Politics Department in the 1970s was on Austrian fin-de-siècle poet Hugo von Hofmannsthal.

Brett's 2017 biography of Alfred Deakin won the 2018 National Biography Award. Her next book, From Secret Ballot to Democracy Sausage: How Australia got Compulsory Voting, was shortlisted for the 2019 Queensland Literary Awards University of Southern Queensland History Book Award.

Brett was appointed a Member of the Order of Australia in the 2023 Australia Day Honours.

Bibliography

As author
Brett, Judith, Australian Liberals and the Moral Middle Class (2003), Cambridge University Press,           
Brett, Judith and Anthony Moran, Ordinary Peoples' Politics (2006), Pluto Press Australia,            
Brett, Judith, Unlocking the History of the Australasian Kuo Min Tang 1911-2013, (2013) Australian Scholarly Publishing, 
Brett, Judith, Robert Menzies' Forgotten People (2007), Melbourne University Press,           
Brett, Judith, The Enigmatic Mr Deakin (2018), Text Publishing Company, 
Brett, Judith, From Secret Ballot to Democracy Sausage: How Australia Got Compulsory Voting (2019), Text Publishing Company,

As editor
Brett, Judith, Political Lives (1997) Allen & Unwin,

Journal articles and Quarterly Essays
QE 19 Relaxed & Comfortable: The Liberal Party's Australia (2005) 
QE 28 Exit Right: The Unravelling of John Howard (2007) 
QE 42 Fair Share: Country and City in Australia (2011) 

QE 78 The Coal Curse: Resources, Climate and Australia's Future  (2020)

References

External links
Brett's profile at La Trobe University

1949 births
Living people
Australian political scientists
Members of the Order of Australia
Academic staff of La Trobe University
The Monthly people
People from Melbourne
21st-century Australian writers
21st-century Australian women writers
Australian biographers
Women biographers
Women political scientists